André Conrardy (February 13, 1928 – June 10, 1990) was a Luxembourgian sprint canoer, born in Redange, who competed in the early 1960s. At the 1960 Summer Olympics in Rome, he was eliminated in the repechage round of the K-1 1000 m event.

References
André Conrardy's profile at Sports Reference.com

1928 births
1990 deaths
People from Redange
Canoeists at the 1960 Summer Olympics
Luxembourgian male canoeists
Olympic canoeists of Luxembourg